Cotyadesmus brunneus is a species of beetle in the family Cerambycidae. It was described by Per Olof Christopher Aurivillius in 1923 and is known from Colombia.

References

Hemilophini
Beetles described in 1923